Spelungula is a monotypic genus of South Pacific large-clawed spiders containing the single species, Spelungula cavernicola, or the Nelson cave spider. It was first described by Ray Forster, Norman I. Platnick, & Michael R. Gray in 1987, and has only been found in caves in the northwestern part of New Zealand's South Island.

Etymology
The genus name is derived from "spelunca", which is latin for cave and is feminine in gender. The species name "cavernicola" refers to the species restriction to caves.

Description

Conservation status
It is one of the few spider species afforded legal protection under the New Zealand Wildlife Act. It is classed as "Range Restricted" and stable in the New Zealand Threat Classification System. 

In May 2022, the Crazy Paving Cave in Kahurangi National Park, where the spiders are known to breed, was closed for a year in an attempt to help the population to recover.

See also
Spiders of New Zealand

References

Cave spiders
Endemic fauna of New Zealand
Gradungulidae
IUCN Red List data deficient species
Monotypic Araneomorphae genera
Spiders of New Zealand
Taxa named by Raymond Robert Forster
Endemic spiders of New Zealand